Fabedougou is a village in the Bérégadougou Department of Comoé Province in south-western Burkina Faso. The village has a 

population of 920.

Domes of Fabedougou 
The Domes of Fabedougou are natural sandstone or limestone rock formations found within the village. The stone is Proterozoic and almost 2 million years old. The area is mostly surrounded by sugar cane fields.

References

Populated places in the Cascades Region
Comoé Province